Lethyna is a genus of tephritid  or fruit flies in the family Tephritidae.

Species
Lethyna aequabilis Munro, 1957
Lethyna blaesa Munro, 1957
Lethyna evanida (Bezzi, 1924)
Lethyna gladiatrix (Bezzi, 1920)
Lethyna liliputiana (Bezzi, 1924)
Lethyna nexilis Munro, 1957
Lethyna permodica Munro, 1957

References

Tephritinae
Tephritidae genera
Diptera of Africa